Wild Place Project is a wildlife conservation park in South Gloucestershire, United Kingdom. It is run by the Bristol Zoological Society (BZS) and was the sister site of Bristol Zoo until closure of that site in 2022. In early 2024, the Wild Place Project will become the new Bristol Zoo and be home to new exhibits.

The park has been designed to link specific ecosystems and conservation programmes around the world, and was originally intended to be split into biomes, representing species found only in specific habitats.  Current areas include: British Ancient woodland, Benoué National Park and Discover Madagascar.

The species list currently includes red river hog, cheetah, zebra, antelope, common eland, meerkat, gelada baboon, Kirk's dik-dik, Pink pigeon, Visayan tarictic hornbill, village weaver, reticulated giraffe, wolverine, arctic fox,  eurasian lynx, grey wolf and brown bear.

History

Wild Place Project is located on Hollywood Estate, a grade II listed estate. The estate was gifted to Bristol Zoological Society in the mid 1960s by the White family. From the 1960s to 2013 the site was used as an off show area for breeding and quarantine. The site also housed the society's nurseries and to this day grows a third of the food for the animals at both Bristol Zoo and Wild Place Project.

In 2008 Bristol Zoological Society announced plans to submit plans to South Gloucestershire Council for the development of a new 55-hectare park.

The park officially opened on 22 July 2013. The original submitted plans suggested a development cost of circa £70 million.

Bear Wood, an environment designed to mimic England in 8,000 BC opened in July 2019.

Plans for 2022 to 2024
Bristol Zoo announced on 27 November 2020 that its historic main centre in Clifton would close, with animals moved to the Wild Place Project site close to the M5 motorway. In early 2024 the Wild Place Project would become the new Bristol Zoo and be home to new exhibits:

 Western lowland gorilla, Collared mangabey, African grey parrots, Slender-snouted crocodiles will be in a new central African rainforest area.
 The Eastern black rhinoceros and Ostrich would join the Giraffe, Zebra, Eland, Red river hog and Cheetah in the Benoue National Park area.

The new conservation breeding centre would  include Annam leaf turtle, Lesser Antillean iguana, Pancake Tortoise, Radiated tortoise, Roti Island snake-necked turtle, Indochinese box turtle, Agalychnis lemur, Leptodactylus fallax, Marshall's pygmy chameleon, Lygodactylus williamsi, Varanus macraei, Uroplatus, Hogna ingens, Polynesian tree snail, Lord Howe Island stick insect, Madeiran land snail, Socorro dove, Visayan tarictic hornbill, Sumatran laughingthrush, Philippine cockatoo, Javan green magpie, European turtle dove, Mindanao bleeding-heart, Negros bleeding-heart pigeon, pink pigeon, Malagasy cichlids, Malagasy rainbow fish and powder blue panchax, Pupfish and goodeids and White clawed crayfish.

Finally, there was to be a new entrance with a new café, new gift shop, and new entry exhibits.

In 2021 it was announced that new features at the Wild Place Project resulting from the move from Clifton were to include a conservation breeding centre with climate-controlled enclosures, a learning centre and a conservation medicine centre.

References

External links
 Wild Place web site

Tourist attractions in Bristol
Grade II listed buildings in Bristol
Zoos in England
Zoos established in 2013